The Recife Metro (Portuguese: Metrô do Recife, Metrorec) is a rapid transit system serving the Metropolitan Region of Recife, Pernambuco, Brazil. It is operated by the federally-owned Companhia Brasileira de Trens Urbanos (CBTU) and currently serves 29 stations, along  of track. The system is complemented by two diesel-powered light rail lines with seven additional stations. In 2018, the combined system carried 102,089,000 passengers.

Characteristics
The contemporary metro, entirely aboveground, began construction in 1983, with funding from the World Bank. The metro consists of the Center Line (with two branches, Center-1 and Center-2) and the South Line, which all radiate outward from Recife station.

The stations were designed to include various non-written means of identification, as the Northeast Region has a substantial rate of illiteracy (13.9% as of 2019). In addition to audio messages announcing the name of the stop, there are visual cues: a different color is used on the walls of every station, and stations are uniquely identified with pictograms, similar to the Mexico City Metro.

Center Line trains leaving Recife station have one of two destinations: Center-1 trains run to Camaragibe, while Center-2 trains serve Jaboatão dos Guararapes. The two branches run on the same tracks between Recife station and Coqueiral station, reusing the route of an old railway track, where the metro system was built. The South line runs from Recife station parallel to the shore of the Atlantic.

After completion of the expansion of the network that occurred from February 2005 to March 2009, the metro grew to its current  in length.

Diesel light rail 
Two light rail lines link the city of Cabo de Santo Agostinho with Recife and provide a connection between the Center-1 and South lines through the suburbs. The rail lines are not electrified, and use diesel vehicles. Terminology varies, with the CBTU and media referring to it both as the VLT and as the Linha Diesel ('Diesel line'), the name of the former heavy rail service.

Bus integration 
The system also includes several bus lines linked from the terminals of bus/metro integration designated SEI (Sistema Estrutural Integrado - "Integrated Structural System") through which passengers may continue their travel on the same ticket.

Lines

Metro
All three lines are elevated or at grade, and trains are powered by overhead lines.

† Center-1 and Center-2 lines share a significant amount of track. The precise length of each branch has not been published.

Light rail
Metre gauge ( is used, in common with most other railways in Brazil. It is built at grade.

Rolling stock

Stations

Notes
SEI: integration with local buses
1: Center-1, Center-2 and South lines run together between Recife and Joana Bezerra stations
2: Center-1 and Center-2 run together between Recife and Coqueiral stations

Network map (excluding light rail)

See also
List of metro systems
 Rapid transit in Brazil

References

External links
 CBTU Recife – official website 
 Parent company CBTU's website; Contains links to other Brazilian urban rail systems
 Photographic gallery for the Diesel line (pictures taken at a "photographical excursion" involving several photo artists at 19 August 2009)

Metro
Rapid transit in Brazil
Transport in Pernambuco
Electric railways in Brazil